Double Door is a 1934 American pre-Code thriller film directed by Charles Vidor, written by Jack Cunningham and Gladys Lehman, and starring Evelyn Venable, Mary Morris, Anne Revere, and Kent Taylor. The film follows a young bride who finds herself tormented by her wealthy husband's abusive spinster sister in their New York City mansion. It is based on the 1933 Broadway play of the same name by Elizabeth A. McFadden and was billed in the opening credits as "The play that made Broadway gasp". Both Morris and Revere reprised their Broadway roles in the film. Though Morris had a long stage career, this is her only film performance.

The film was released on May 4, 1934, by Paramount Pictures.

Plot
In 1910 Manhattan, Victoria Van Brett is a bitter, domineering spinster who lives an isolated life with her half-sister, Caroline, in the palatial mansion built by their late industrialist father. Victoria keeps the home shuttered and rarely leaves, controlling the operations of the residence, as well as Caroline's daily life. The sisters' younger half-brother, Rip, returns home to wed Anne Darrow, a nurse who saved his life. Victoria believes Anne to be a social climber after the family money, and surreptitiously has Rip's name removed from the family will on his wedding day. She inflicts other cruelties on the wedding day, including sabotaging the organ during Anne's walk down the aisle.

While Rip and Anne go on their honeymoon, Victoria forces Caroline to take her side, threatening to lock Caroline away in a soundproof vault, where Caroline will face death by suffocation. Victoria demands that Rip and Anne must return to handle the affairs of the estate. Rip informs Victoria that he and Anne plan to move out of the familial mansion and purchase a home of their own. This enrages Victoria.

Rip recounts childhood memories of Victoria's abusive behavior toward him after their father died. Anne attempts to retaliate against Victoria, but at a dinner party Victoria accuses Anne of having an affair with the family doctor, John Lucas. Anne declares she is leaving the mansion.

Victoria offers to send Anne away with heirloom pearls that Victoria previously denied Anne on her wedding day. Anne is lured by Victoria to the soundproof vault in the mansion. Once in the vault, Victoria locks the door behind her, sealing Anne inside. Caroline hears Anne's initial scream before the vault closes, and rushes to the room, but Victoria insists that Caroline was only having a nightmare. Caroline notices Anne's suitcase on the floor before she returns to bed.

Rip and attorney Mortimer attempt to locate the missing Anne, whom Victoria asserts left Rip for John. The men ultimately locate the vault and Anne is saved. Caroline finally defies Victoria by telling her she is leaving with Rip and Anne. Victoria tries to lure Caroline into the vault with her, but Caroline refuses and departs. Mortimer reverts the family will back to Rip, and blackmails Victoria with her attempted murder of Anne, threatening to report her to police if she does not sign the will. After Mortimer exits the room, Victoria realizes they have forgotten the pearls. As she enters the vault to retrieve them, the door closes behind her and seals her doom.

Cast

Production
The film was adapted from the stage play of the same name by Elizabeth McFadden, which was opened on Broadway in 1933. Both Mary Morris and Anne Revere reprised their stage roles for the film version. The characters of Caroline and Victoria Van Brett were both loosely based on the last-surviving sisters of the Wendels, a powerful New York City family who resided in a large mansion together (seven siblings in total, all unmarried) in isolation for most of their lives.

Filming was to begin in January 1934 but Paramount waited until lead actress Mary Morris, who was playing in the stage version in Philadelphia, had finished her engagement and could join the production team in Hollywood.

Reception
The New York Times review was favorable: "The film version of Miss McFadden's play is a careful and intelligent copy of the original." Morris was praised for her "highly effective performance", while "Evelyn Venable, as the young wife, and Anne Revere, as the sister (the part she played on the stage), are admirable foils for the cruel old witch. They are reinforced effectively by Kent Taylor, Sir Guy Standing and Colin Tapley."

Mary Morris received superior notices for her screen performance. Paramount tried to sign her for additional films, but Morris was unimpressed by the Hollywood scene and returned immediately to the stage, where she continued to tour the New England states in Double Door during the summer of 1934.

References

Sources

External links
 

1934 films
1934 drama films
1934 horror films
1930s thriller films
American black-and-white films
American films based on plays
American drama films
American horror films
American thriller films
Films à clef
Films about dysfunctional families
Films about inheritances
Films directed by Charles Vidor
Films set in New York City
Films shot in Los Angeles
Paramount Pictures films
1930s American films
1930s English-language films